Rhynocoris rubricus is a species belonging to the family Reduviidae, subfamily Harpactorinae.

The base of the scutellum is slightly longer or equal to its height, the front lobe of pronotum is red and femora have a narrow black band.

This species is mainly found in France, Italy,  Slovenia, Croatia and Albania.

References
 Putshkov P.V., Putshkov V.G., 1996 - Family Reduviidae - Catalogue of the Heteroptera of the Palaearctic Region
 Dioli P., 1990 - Rhinocoris iracundus (Poda, 1761) e Rhinocoris rubricus (Germar, 1816). (Insecta, Heteroptera, Reduviidae). Il Naturalista Valtellinese - Atti Mus. civ. St. Nat. Morbegno (SO). 
 Rieger C., 1972 - Zu Rhinocoris Hahn, 1833 (Heteroptera). Dtsch. Ent. Zeitsch. Stuttgart.

External links
 Biolib
 Fauna Europaea

Reduviidae
Hemiptera of Europe
Insects described in 1814